Rita of Cascia (Italian: Rita da Cascia) is a 1943 Italian historical film directed by Antonio Leonviola and starring Elena Zareschi, Ugo Sasso and Beatrice Mancini. It was made at the Farnesina Studios of Titanus in Rome. The film portrays the life of the Catholic saint Rita of Cascia.

Cast
 Elena Zareschi as Rita da Cascia  
 Ugo Sasso as Paolo di Ferdinando  
 Beatrice Mancini as Ada  
 Marcello Giorda as Antonio, il padre di Rita  
 Laura Nucci as Jacoviella  
 Augusto Marcacci as Il barone di Collegiacone  
 Elodia Maresca as Amata 
 Teresa Franchini as La madre superiore  
 Stefano Sciaccaluga as Il pellegrino  
 Giulio Battiferri as Lampo, il servo spia del barone  
 Gian Paolo Rosmino as Frate Remigio 
 Luigi Garrone as Il taverniere 
 Umberto Spadaro as Il delatore nella taverna  
 Giovanni Onorato as Un cliente nella taverna  
 Amina Pirani Maggi as Una suora  
 Nera Bruni as Un'altra suora  
 Vittoria Mongardi as Una conversa 
 Elio Marcuzzo as Gian Giacomo  
 Aleardo Ward as Paolo Maria  
 Umberto Leurini as Gian Giacomo da bambino 
 Amedeo Leurini as Paolo Maria da bambino 
 Adele Garavaglia 
 Lamberto Picasso

References

Bibliography
 Nerenberg, Ellen Victoria. Prison Terms: Representing Confinement During and After Italian Fascism. University of Toronto Press, 2001.

External links 

1943 films
Italian historical films
1940s historical films
1940s Italian-language films
Films directed by Antonio Leonviola
Films set in the 14th century
Films set in the 15th century
Italian black-and-white films
1940s Italian films